Euchromia cyanitis is a moth of the subfamily Arctiinae. It was described by Edward Meyrick in 1889. It is found in New Guinea.

References

Moths described in 1889
Euchromiina